Between Anglo-Saxon times and the nineteenth century the English county of Essex was divided for administrative purposes into 19 hundreds, plus the Liberty of Havering-atte-Bower and the boroughs of Colchester, Harwich, and Maldon. Each hundred had a separate council that met each month to rule on local judicial and taxation matters.

Essex probably originated as a shire in the time of Æthelstan. The Domesday Survey listed nineteen hundreds, corresponding very closely in extent and in name with those that were in use until early in the twentieth century. The additional half-hundred of Thunreslan on the border with Suffolk no longer exists, and the hundred of Witbrictesherna was renamed Dengie. The liberty of Havering-atte-Bower was formed from land taken from Becontree hundred.

Parishes

At the start of the 19th century, the hundreds contained the following parishes:

References

See also
History of Essex
List of hundreds of England and Wales

 
History of local government in London (pre-1855)
Essex